Marice N. Magdolot is a Filipino international football player who plays as a midfielder. She also played as part the varsity women's football team of the University of Santo Tomas and was named MVP in UAAP Season 74.

She contributed a goal in the Philippines' 7–2 win over Singapore at the 2012 AFF Women's Championship.

International goals

References

1993 births
Living people
Filipino women's footballers
Philippines women's international footballers
Sportspeople from Davao City
Women's association football midfielders
University of Santo Tomas alumni